Yurun Group Limited is the largest meat supplier in Mainland China. It is headquartered in Nanjing, Jiangsu. It operates in two food sectors, chilled meat and frozen meat, and processed meat products, which are marketed under its brand names of Yurun, Furun, Wangrun, and Popular Meat Packing.

It was listed on the Hong Kong Stock Exchange in 2005.

References

External links
Yurun Group Limited (Simplified Chinese)
Yurun Group Limited (Traditional Chinese)

Companies listed on the Hong Kong Stock Exchange
Food and drink companies established in 1993
Food and drink companies of China
Manufacturing companies based in Nanjing
Privately held companies of China
Chinese brands